Timothy Benjamin Thomas (born 28 March 1983) is a British Muay Thai kickboxer who competes in the welterweight and middleweight divisions. He came to prominence by winning the UKMF British Welterweight Muay Thai title early in his career before becoming the ISKA World Welterweight Muay Thai Champion in 2005. He lost this belt in 2008 after one successful title defence, but later became a world champion for the second time in Jersey against Michael Blood for the WRSA title. He won by TKO in the 5th round. He then regained the ISKA World title under Kun Khmer rules in 2011.

Career
A British Jamaican, Thomas first came to prominence when he won the UKMF British Welterweight (-67 kg/147 lb) Muay Thai Championship early in his career. In 2005, he defeated Farid Laidhouni in Belgium to win the ISKA World Welterweight (-67 kg/147 lb) Muay Thai title.

The following year, on 2 April 2006, he fought 
at the historic Rajadamnern Stadium in Bangkok, Thailand for the first time where he knocked out Samart Sor Kor Pira in round two. He then made the first defence of his ISKA world title by winning on points in Glasgow, Scotland against Lloyd Cochrane on 15 October 2006.

He lost his ISKA strap to Frankie Hudders on 29 March 2008 when he lost a majority decision in Manchester, England. Thomas was given the chance to win another world title when he took on Abraham Roqueñi for the ISKA World Super Welterweight (-69.5 kg/153 lb) Freestyle Kickboxing title in Laredo, Spain on 11 April 2009 but was knocked out with a high kick in the seventh round.

On 23 March 2010, Thomas competed in the I-1 World Muaythai Grand Prix 2010, a 66 kg/145 lb one-night, eight-man tournament held in Kowloon Bay, Hong Kong and was eliminated at the quarter-final stage when he lost a split decision to Santichai Or. Boonchauy. He returned to the following year's edition of the tournament, the I-1 World Muaythai Grand Prix 2011 on 21 April 2011, and fared slightly better by besting Lerm Ratchakhom by unanimous decision in the quarters before losing a split decision to Kurt Finlayson in the semis.

Thomas became a world champion for the second time by defeating Michael Blood in Jersey by 5th-round TKO. Stopping him with kicks giving Michael a suspected broken arm. On 6 July 2011 he defeated Maes Chantha by technical knockout at the Olympic Stadium in Phnom Penh, Cambodia to regain the ISKA World Welterweight Kun Khmer title. He sent his opponent to the canvas three times in the fifth round, forcing the referee to stop the bout. The fight was not without controversy, however as Thomas was unable to make the contracted weight of 67 kg/147 lb on the scales provided and instead weighed in at 68.0 kg/151 lb. Just twenty-four days later, Thomas fought to a draw with former Rajadamnern champion Malaipet in Las Vegas, Nevada, United States.

On 20 January 2012, he lost on points against Ludovic Millet in a five-rounder for the vacant ISKA World Super Welterweight (-69.5 kg/153.2 lb) Oriental Championship in Meaux, France.

In 2012, he signed with the Glory promotion and was included in the 2012 Middleweight Slam tournament, replacing Tie Yinghua on short notice to join sixteen of the world's best fighters at 70 kg/154 lb. The tournament kicked off in Stockholm, Sweden at Glory 1: Stockholm - 2012 Middleweight Slam First 16 on 26 May 2012 where he defeated Dennis Schneidmiller by unanimous decision.

Advancing to the tournament final eight at Glory 3: Rome - 2012 Middleweight Slam Final 8 in Rome, Italy on 3 November 2012, Thomas was drawn against Robin van Roosmalen at the quarter-finals. He was wobbled with a variety of blows by the Dutchman, forcing the referee to stop the bout in round two.

He met Reece McAllister in a 67 kg/147 lb catchweight bout at Glory 5: London on 23 March 2013 in London, England and lost a unanimous decision.

He TKO'd Marcel Tratnik in round two at Day of Destruction 7 in Hamburg, Germany on 14 September 2013 to win the WFCA European Junior Middleweight (-69.85 kg/154 lb) K-1 Championship.

Thomas competed at the -65 kg/143 lb Thai Max tournament in Meyreuil, France on 19 October 2013, defeating Alessio D'Angelo by unanimous decision in the quarter-finals before losing to the eventual champion Damien Alamos by the same margin in the semis.

He lost to Reece McAllister on points after being dropped with an elbow in a highly anticipated rematch at Yokkao 8 in Bolton, England on 8 March 2014.

Thomas attempted a comeback against prospect Connor McCormack on 4 June 2016 at Champions Collide in Coventry, England. Tim lost the fight in the second round via head kick knockout before again announcing his retirement from the sport.

Championships and awards

Kickboxing
International Sport Karate Association
ISKA World Welterweight (-67 kg/147 lb) Muay Thai Championship
ISKA World Welterweight (-67 kg/147 lb) Kun Khmer Championship
United Kingdom Muaythai Federation
UKMF British Welterweight (-67 kg/147 lb) Muay Thai Championship
World Full Contact Association
WFCA European Junior Middleweight (-69.85 kg/154 lb) K-1 Championship

Kickboxing record 

|-
|-  bgcolor="#FFBBBB"
| 2016-06-04 || Loss ||align=left| Connor McCormack || Champions Collide|| Coventry, England || KO (high kick) || 2 || 2:20
|-
|-  bgcolor="#FFBBBB"
| 2014-03-08 || Loss ||align=left| Reece McAllister || Yokkao 8 || Bolton, England || Decision || 3 || 3:00
|-
|-  bgcolor="#FFBBBB"
| 2013-10-19 || Loss ||align=left| Damien Alamos || Thai Max, Semi Finals || Meyreuil, France || Decision (unanimous) || 3 || 3:00
|-
|-  bgcolor="#CCFFCC"
| 2013-10-19 || Win ||align=left| Alessio D'Angelo || Thai Max, Quarter Finals || Meyreuil, France || Decision (unanimous) || 3 || 3:00
|-
|-  bgcolor="#CCFFCC"
| 2013-09-14 || Win ||align=left| Marcel Tratnik || Day of Destruction 7 || Hamburg, Germany || TKO || 2 || 
|-
! style=background:white colspan=9 |
|-
|-  bgcolor="#FFBBBB"
| 2013-03-23 || Loss ||align=left| Reece McAllister || Glory 5: London || London, England || Decision (unanimous) || 3 || 3:00
|-
|-  bgcolor="#FFBBBB"
| 2012-11-03 || Loss ||align=left| Robin van Roosmalen || Glory 3: Rome - 70 kg Slam Tournament, Quarter Finals || Rome, Italy || TKO (referee stoppage) || 2 || 1:05
|-
|-  bgcolor="#CCFFCC"
| 2012-05-26 || Win ||align=left| Dennis Schneidmiller || Glory 1: Stockholm - 70 kg Slam Tournament, First Round || Stockholm, Sweden || Decision (unanimous) || 3 || 3:00
|-
|-  bgcolor="#CCFFCC"
| 2012-03-31 || Win ||align=left| Andy Thrasher || The Main Event || Manchester, England || TKO (punches) || 2 ||
|-
|-  bgcolor="#FFBBBB"
| 2012-01-21 || Loss ||align=left| Ludovic Millet || Championnat du Monde ISKA || Meaux, France || Decision || 5 || 3:00
|-
! style=background:white colspan=9 |
|-
|-  bgcolor="#CCFFCC"
| 2011-11-06 || Win ||align=left| Imran Khan || Showdown 10 || Sheffield, England || KO (right elbow) || 5 || 
|-
|-  style="background:#c5d2ea;"
| 2011-07-30 || Draw ||align=left| Malaipet || Elite Kickboxing || Las Vegas, Nevada, USA || Decision (majority) || 5 || 3:00
|-
|-  bgcolor="#CCFFCC"
| 2011-07-06 || Win ||align=left| Meas Chantha || || Phnom Penh, Cambodia || TKO (referee stoppage) || 5 || 
|-
! style=background:white colspan=9 |
|-
|-  bgcolor="#FFBBBB"
| 2011-04-21 || Loss ||align=left| Kurt Finlayson || I-1 World Muaythai Grand Prix 2011, Semi Finals || Kowloon Bay, Hong Kong || Decision (split) || 3 || 3:00
|-
|-  bgcolor="#CCFFCC"
| 2011-04-21 || Win ||align=left| Lerm Ratchakhom || I-1 World Muaythai Grand Prix 2011, Quarter Finals || Kowloon Bay, Hong Kong || Decision (unanimous) || 3 || 3:00
|-
|-  bgcolor="#FFBBBB"
| 2010-09-11 || Loss ||align=left| Andrei Kotsur || Fight Sport Champions Trophy, Quarter Finals || Birmingham, England || Decision || 3 || 3:00
|-
|-  bgcolor="#CCFFCC"
| 2010-05-29 || Win ||align=left| Yodyut Kiatyongyut || MSA Muaythai Premier League || London, England || TKO (referee stoppage) || 4 || 
|-
|-  bgcolor="#FFBBBB"
| 2010-03-23 || Loss ||align=left| Santichai Or. Boonchauy || I-1 World Muaythai Grand Prix 2010, Quarter Finals || Kowloon Bay, Hong Kong || Decision (split) || 3 || 3:00
|-
|-  bgcolor="#FFBBBB"
| 2009-04-11 || Loss ||align=left| Abraham Roqueñi || || Laredo, Spain || KO (high kick) || 7 ||  
|-
! style=background:white colspan=9 |
|-
|-  bgcolor="#FFBBBB"
| 2008-11-00 || Loss ||align=left| Jordan Watson || The Contender Asia UK Tournament, Quarter Finals || Watford, England || Decision || 3 || 3:00
|-
|-  bgcolor="#FFBBBB"
| 2008-03-29 || Loss ||align=left| Frankie Hudders || ISKA World Championship Thaiboxing || Manchester, England || Decision (majority) || 5 || 3:00
|-
! style=background:white colspan=9 |
|-
|-  bgcolor="#CCFFCC"
| 2007-11-11 || Win ||align=left| Michael Dicks || Muay Thai Superfights || Wolverhampton, England || TKO (cut) || 2 || 
|-
|-  bgcolor="#FFBBBB"
| 2007-05-20 || Loss ||align=left| Sofiane Allouache || K-1 UK MAX Tournament 2007 Pain & Glory, Semi Finals || London, England || TKO (referee stoppage) || 1 || 
|-
|-  bgcolor="#CCFFCC"
| 2007-05-20 || Win ||align=left| Leroy Morgardo || K-1 UK MAX Tournament 2007 Pain & Glory, Reserve Match || London, England || Decision || 3 || 3:00
|-
|-  bgcolor="#FFBBBB"
| 2007-03-04 || Loss ||align=left| Craig Jose || Power of Scotland 2, Semi Finals || Scotland || Decision || 3 || 3:00
|-
|-  bgcolor="#CCFFCC"
| 2007-03-04 || Win ||align=left| Rudolf Durica || Power of Scotland 2, Quarter Finals || Scotland || Decision || 3 || 3:00
|-
|-  bgcolor="#CCFFCC"
| 2006-10-15 || Win ||align=left| Lloyd Cochrane || New Breed || Glasgow, Scotland || Decision || 5 || 3:00
|-
! style=background:white colspan=9 |
|-
|-  bgcolor="#CCFFCC"
| 2006-04-02 || Win ||align=left| Samart Sor Kor Pira || Rajadamnern Stadium || Bangkok, Thailand || KO || 2 || 
|-
|-  bgcolor="#CCFFCC"
| 2005-00-00 || Win ||align=left| Farid Laidhouni || || Belgium || || || 
|-
! style=background:white colspan=9 |
|-
|-  bgcolor="#CCFFCC"
| 2004-07-24 || Win ||align=left| Yutaro Yamauchi || AJKF: Super Fight ~ Maximum || Tokyo, Japan || TKO (cut) || 4 || 0:36
|-
|-  bgcolor="#FFBBBB"
| 2003-11-09 || Loss ||align=left| Neil Woods || K-1 UK MAX 2003, Semi Finals || Birmingham, England || KO || 2 || 
|-
|-  bgcolor="#CCFFCC"
| 2003-11-09 || Win ||align=left| Seamus Cogan || K-1 UK MAX 2003, Quarter Finals || Birmingham, England || Decision (unanimous) || 3 || 3:00
|-
|-
| colspan=9 | Legend:

References

External links
 Official Glory profile

1983 births
Living people
English male kickboxers
Welterweight kickboxers
Middleweight kickboxers
English Muay Thai practitioners
Black British sportsmen
English people of Jamaican descent
Sportspeople from Bedford